Mohammadiyeh (also Romanized as Moḩammadīyeh) is a village in Qasemabad Rural District, in the Central District of Rafsanjan County, Kerman Province, Iran. At the 2006 census, its population was 232, in 62 families.

References 

Populated places in Rafsanjan County